The John B. Campbell Handicap is an American thoroughbred horse race run annually at Laurel Park Racecourse, in Laurel, Maryland, United States. Run in mid-February, it is open to horses age three and older and is contested on dirt over a distance of  miles (9 furlongs). The purse is $100,000.

Honoree and inaugural
The race was named for John Blanks Campbell, an internationally noted racing secretary and the handicapper who set the annual Experimental Free Handicap weights, who died at age 77 on July 7, 1954. The inaugural edition of the John B. Campbell race was run on December 4, 1954, as the John B. Campbell Memorial Handicap at Bowie Race Track.

After the inaugural running, the race was set for the spring of each year beginning in 1955. From 1986 until 2001, it was held at Pimlico Race Course, in Baltimore, and was raced at a distance of  miles.

In his book Legacies of the Turf, prominent racing historian Edward L. Bowen says that at one time the John B. Campbell Handicap was a race of national importance. During the mid-1950s and 1960s the race was won by outstanding horses such as Sailor, Dedicate, Mongo, and the great U.S. Racing Hall of Fame inductee, Kelso.

Records 

Speed record: 
  miles – 2:05.60 – Broad Brush (1987)
  miles – 1:40.00 – In Reality (1968) 
  miles – 1:47.35 – Redding Colliery  (2010)

Most wins by an horse:
 3 – Sunny Sunrise      (1992, 1993 & 1996)

Most wins by a jockey:
 3 – Rick Wilson    (1993, 1998 & 1999)

Most wins by a trainer:
 4 – Richard W. Small    (1976, 1987, 1998, 2009)

Winners of the John B. Campbell Handicap since 1962 

* † In 2001, Top Official won but was disqualified to third.
A * designates that the race was run in two divisions in 1972 and 1973.

Earlier winners
1962 – Yorktown     (Jimmy Nichols)
1961 – Conestoga     (Roy L. Gilbert)
1960 – Yes You Will     (Larry Adams)
1959 – Vertex     (Sam Boulmetis Sr.)
1958 – Promised Land     (Ismael Valenzuela)
1957 – Dedicate    (William Boland)
1956 – Sailor     (Bill Hartack)
1955 – Social Outcast     (Eric Guerin)
1954 – Joe Jones     (Conn McCreary)

See also 
 John B. Campbell Handicap top three finishers

References

External links
 The John B. Campbell Handicap at Pedigree Query

Open middle distance horse races
Ungraded stakes races in the United States
1954 establishments in Maryland
Laurel Park Racecourse
Bowie Race Track
Horse races in Maryland
Recurring sporting events established in 1954